The following list shows specific aeronautical transponder codes, and ranges of codes, that have been used for specific purposes in various countries. Traditionally each country has allocated transponder codes by their own scheme with little commonality across borders. The list is retained for historic interest.

Pilots are normally required to apply the code, allocated by air traffic control, to that specific flight. Occasionally countries may specify generic codes to be used in the absence of an allocated code. Such generic codes are specified in that country's Aeronautical Information Manual or Aeronautical Information Publication. There also are standard transponder codes for defined situations defined by the International Civil Aviation Organization (marked below as ICAO).

Transponder codes shown in this list in the color RED are for emergency use only such as an aircraft hijacking, radio communication failure or another type of emergency.

References

Encodings
Avionics